Batrisus is a genus of ant-loving beetles in the family Staphylinidae. There are numerous described species in Batrisus.

Species
The species belonging to the genus Batrisus include but are not limited to:

 Batrisus angulipes (L. W. Schaufuss, 1882)
 Batrisus antennatus (Motschulsky, 1851)
 Batrisus antiquus (L. W. Schaufuss, 1890)
 Batrisus armigerides (Newton, 2017)
 Batrisus bryaxoides (Motschulsky, 1851)
 Batrisus crassipes (Sharp, 1887)
 Batrisus dennyi (Motschulsky, 1851)
 Batrisus erivanus (Motschulsky, 1845)
 Batrisus excavatus (Motschulsky, 1851)
 Batrisus formicarius (Aubé, 1883)
 Batrisus grouvellei (L. W. Schaufuss, 1882)
 Batrisus grypochirus (L. W. Schaufuss, 1882)
 Batrisus heterocerus (Motschulsky, 1851)
 Batrisus lamellipes (Sharp, 1887)
 Batrisus longulus (Motschulsky, 1851)
 Batrisus nodifrons (Motschulsky, 1851)
 Batrisus nodosus (Motschulsky, 1851)
 Batrisus obtusicornis (Motschulsky, 1845)
 Batrisus ormayi (Reitter, 1885)
 Batrisus pexus (Motschulsky, 1851)
 Batrisus piliferus (Motschulsky, 1851)
 Batrisus politus Sharp, 1883
 Batrisus pristinus (L. W. Schaufuss, 1890)
 Batrisus sibiricus (Sharp, 1874)
 Batrisus spiniventris (Motschulsky, 1851)
 Batrisus tauricu (Motschulsky, 1851)
 Batrisus taurus (Besuchet, 2004)
 Batrisus trichothorax (Tanokuchi, 1988)

References

Pselaphinae genera
Beetles described in 1833